Saint Kitts and Nevis competed in the 2014 Commonwealth Games in Glasgow, Scotland from 23 July to 3 August 2014. The team consists of 12 athletes in two sports.

Athletics

The team consisted of 9 athletes.

Men

Women

Key
Note–Ranks given for track events are within the athlete's heat only
Q = Qualified for the next round
q = Qualified for the next round as a fastest loser or, in field events, by position without achieving the qualifying target
NR = National record
N/A = Round not applicable for the event
Bye = Athlete not required to compete in round

Table tennis

The team consisted of 3 athletes.

Singles

Doubles

See also
Saint Kitts and Nevis at the 2014 Summer Youth Olympics

References

Nations at the 2014 Commonwealth Games
Saint Kitts and Nevis at the Commonwealth Games
2014 in Saint Kitts and Nevis